Cyril Lloyd Francis  (March 19, 1920 – January 20, 2007) was a Canadian politician and one time Speaker of the House of Commons of Canada.

Biography 
Following service in the Royal Canadian Air Force during World War II, Francis earned a Master of Arts (MA) and doctorate (Ph.D) in economics, and lectured in the discipline from 1948 to 1951 at the University at Buffalo. He then joined the Department of National Health and Welfare in Ottawa as a senior economist.

In 1956, Francis and partner, lawyer Donald Sim, carrying on business as Lynhar Developments, acquired and laid out the Stinson Avenue area of Bells Corners in Nepean. They quickly formed a partnership with William Teron, T.F.S. Lands, to build the houses in Lynwood Village.

The Lynwood Plaza at Bells Corners was built by Francis and Sim's Lynhar Developments and included what would become the landmark Robinson IGA.

Long time Nepean Reeve D. Aubrey Moodie, in his book, "The Spirit of Nepean" described Francis as one of the contributors to the foundation of Nepean.  Moodie explains about the introduction of lot levies, now known as development charges, and how they contributed to the financial stability of Nepean Township. It was the transfer of large sums of money in the form of lot levies, along with Francis and Teron's aggressive development activity that enabled much of Nepean's Parkwood Hills and Bells Corners neighbourhoods to be built. To the pleasure of some and the disdain of others, Mr. Francis was one of a list of individuals credited with the introduction of lot levies as a development finance tool that is relied upon to this day to fund infrastructure commensurate with new residential developments.

In 1958, Francis became President of the Professional Institute of the Public Service of Canada, a union representing civil servants in certain professions. In 1959, he entered municipal politics by being elected alderman on Ottawa City Council. From 1960 to 1963, he served on the city's Board of Control and as Deputy Mayor.

He entered federal politics as a Liberal candidate in the 1962 election but was defeated in the Ottawa-area riding of Carleton. His electoral record was mixed throughout his career and he would only win election on alternate attempts. Accordingly, he served as Member of Parliament (MP) for Carleton from 1963 to 1965 and then for Ottawa West in 1968–1972, 1974–1979 and 1980–1984.  In his autobiography, Ottawa Boy, Francis described his anger when, in 1974, Liberal Party insiders tried to "parachute" in an alternate candidate, Byron Hyde, a politically inexperienced outsider, to run against him, to be the Liberal Party candidate for his riding.

He served as Chief Government Whip from 1970 to 1971 and then as Parliamentary Secretary to the Minister of Veterans Affairs until he was defeated in the 1972 election. After he returned to Parliament in the 1974 election, he served as Parliamentary Secretary to the President of the Treasury Board from 1975 to 1976.

In 1980, he became Deputy Speaker of the House of Commons. He succeeded Jeanne Sauvé as Speaker on January 15, 1984, when Sauvé became Governor General of Canada.

The Liberal government was defeated in the 1984 election, and Francis lost his seat. His term as Speaker ended when the new House of Commons convened in November of that year.

On the conclusion of his term as Speaker, Francis was appointed to the Queen's Privy Council for Canada. In late 1984, the new Prime Minister of Canada, Brian Mulroney, appointed Francis to the position of Ambassador to Portugal. Francis returned to Ottawa at the conclusion of his appointment in 1987.

He died in January 2007, after suffering from stomach cancer.

Electoral record

References

External links
CBC, Former Ottawa MP, Speaker Lloyd Francis dies, January 22, 2007.
Ottawa Citizen, 'He taught us the duty of public service', January 22, 2007.
Biography of Cyril Lloyd Francis from the Library of Parliament.

1920 births
2007 deaths
Businesspeople from Ottawa
Canadian Unitarians
Liberal Party of Canada MPs
Members of the House of Commons of Canada from Ontario
Members of the King's Privy Council for Canada
Ottawa city councillors
Speakers of the House of Commons of Canada
Deaths from stomach cancer
University at Buffalo alumni
Ottawa controllers
Military personnel from Ottawa
Ambassadors of Canada to Portugal
Royal Canadian Air Force personnel of World War II
Deaths from cancer in Canada
Canadian expatriates in the United States